Graphomya is a genus of true flies of the family Muscidae.

Species
G. alaskensis Arntfield, 1975
G. americana Robineau-Desvoidy, 1830
G. columbiana Arntfield, 1975
G. eustolia Walker, 1849
G. idessa (Walker, 1849)
G. interior Arntfield, 1975
G. maculata (Scopoli, 1763)
G. minor Robineau-Desvoidy, 1830
G. minuta Arntfield, 1975
G. occidentalis Arntfield, 1975
G. transitionis Arntfield, 1975
G. ungava Arntfield, 1975

References

Muscidae
Muscoidea genera
Muscomorph flies of Europe
Taxa named by Jean-Baptiste Robineau-Desvoidy